Events from the year 1971 in the United Arab Emirates.

Incumbents
President: Zayed bin Sultan Al Nahyan (starting 2 December)
Prime Minister: Maktoum bin Rashid Al Maktoum (starting 9 December)

Events

December
 December 2 - Six of the emirates of the Trucial States form the United Arab Emirates.

References

 
Years of the 20th century in the United Arab Emirates
United Arab Emirates
United Arab Emirates
1970s in the United Arab Emirates